The Alabama Theatre is a movie palace in Birmingham, Alabama.  It was built in 1927 by Paramount's Publix Theatre chain as its flagship theater for the southeastern region of the United States. Seating 2,500 people at the time, it was the largest in the Birmingham Theatre district. The district was once home to a myriad of large theaters that featured vaudeville, performing arts, nickelodeons, and large first-run movie palaces.  The Alabama is the only district theater still operating today. Built to show silent films, the Alabama still features its original Wurlitzer theater organ.  Other than the Alabama, the Lyric Theatre is the only theater still standing in the district.
  
The Alabama and its historic organ were added to the Alabama Register of Landmarks and Heritage on February 15, 1977, and to the  National Register of Historic Places on November 13, 1979.  The theater has been surveyed by the Historic American Buildings Survey on several occasions, the last time being in 1996. It was designated as the state's historic theater in 1993.

History
Construction plans for the Alabama were announced in 1926, but ground breaking was delayed until April 1, 1927. The grand opening was held as originally scheduled on December 26, 1927. Construction of the concrete and steel building cost approximately $1.5 million.

In 1934, the Loveman's of Alabama department store next door burned to the ground. Thanks to a thick firewall on that side of the Alabama, the theater was unharmed aside from some smoke damage around air vents in the auditorium.  These smoke stains would remain until the 1998 theater restoration, in concert with the conversion of the 1935 Loveman's building into the McWane Science Center.

One of the things the Alabama Theatre was known for in its early days was its Mickey Mouse Club, which was formed in 1933. Meetings were held every Saturday, where the children would perform for each other, watch Mickey Mouse cartoons, and participate in other activities. The Club also sponsored food and toy drives for the underprivileged. By 1935, the Club had over 7,000 members, making it the biggest Mickey Mouse Club in the world. Membership eventually peaked at over 18,000 before the Club closed almost ten years after it was formed.

Another regular event at the Alabama Theatre was the Miss Alabama Pageant.  From 1935 to 1948, the rules of the Miss America Pageant allowed multiple contestants per state. The Alabama Theatre hosted the Miss Birmingham Pageant in those years. When the rules were changed in 1949, the Alabama Theatre became host to the Miss Alabama Pageant and continued to do so through 1966.

The decline of downtown Birmingham through the 1960s and 1970s saw the closing of most of the downtown's movie theatres. In 1981, Plitt Theatres of Chicago closed the Alabama and sold it to Cobb Theaters of Birmingham. Cobb attempted to reopen the Alabama several times, but was unsuccessful. Cobb eventually sold the Alabama to Costa and Head, developers working to revitalize the downtown area. Costa and Head initiated series of classic movies at the Alabama with some success, but ultimately filed for bankruptcy in 1986.

The Alabama Chapter of the American Theatre Organ Society (ATOS) had been maintaining the Alabama's organ starting in the 1970s. They sought permission to remove the organ from the Alabama to save it, but Costa and Head's creditors deemed it the single most valuable item in the building and forbade its removal. In response the Alabama Chapter of ATOS began a fund-raising effort to buy the Alabama. It was purchased by Birmingham Landmarks, Inc. in 1987.  The non-profit organization was originally started with the sole purpose of saving the theater. With the purchase, the theater was renamed the Alabama Theatre for the Performing Arts. In 1993, the Alabama was designated the official state historic theater of Alabama.

In 1998, the Alabama Theatre underwent a complete restoration, in which gold leaf and other paint was cleaned or replaced, seats were replaced or recovered, and some carpet and drapes were replaced.  Birmingham Landmarks continues to own the theater and has also purchased the Lyric Theatre, a 1914 vaudeville theater located across the street from the Alabama.  The Alabama hosts roughly 250 entertainment events every year. It attracts more than 400,000 people a year to a variety of performances, including Broadway-type theatre, ballet, opera, music concerts, and film.

The Alabama Theatre has hosted American Idol winner Taylor Hicks (from Birmingham) in '07, Jason Isbell & the 400 Unit (from north AL) in '14, and St. Paul & the Broken Bones (from Birmingham) in '14. It hosted the Black Crowes from Atlanta in '91, and the late B.B. King from MS in '03. It hosted Nashville's Kings of Leon in '07. It hosted Birmingham/Nashville's Moon Taxi band in '16. Harry Connick Jr. (from New Orleans) played there in 2010.

Organ

When the Alabama was built in 1927, films were silent and required a musical accompaniment. This was typically provided by an orchestra or theater pipe organ. The Alabama's organ is a Crawford Special-Publix One Mighty Wurlitzer. Only seventeen examples of this model were built, and the Alabama's is one of only three still installed at their original sites.

Nicknamed Big Bertha, the Alabama's organ is a four-manual (keyboard) organ. It was originally installed with 20 ranks (sets of pipes), but has been expanded to 32. It also features numerous percussion instruments and sound effects to accompany silent movies.

References

External links
 Alabama Theatre (official website)
 

1927 establishments in Alabama
Theatres on the National Register of Historic Places in Alabama
National Register of Historic Places in Birmingham, Alabama
Cinemas and movie theaters in Alabama
Buildings and structures in Birmingham, Alabama
Theatres in Alabama
Theatres completed in 1927
Properties on the Alabama Register of Landmarks and Heritage
Mission Revival architecture in Alabama
Spanish Colonial Revival architecture in Alabama
Tourist attractions in Birmingham, Alabama
Historic American Buildings Survey in Alabama
Public venues with a theatre organ
Symbols of Alabama